Althütte is a municipality of the Rems-Murr district in Baden-Württemberg, Germany.

History
The modern municipality of Althütte was formed by the merging of the villages of Althütte and Sechselberg in 1971.

Geography
The municipality (Gemeinde) of Althütte is located in the Rems-Murr district, in the German state of Baden-Württemberg. Althütte is physically located in the Murrhardt Forest, a region of the larger Swabian-Franconian Forest. Elevation above sea level in the municipal area ranges from a high of  Normalnull (NN) to a low of  NN.

Portions of the Federally protected Hörschbachschlucht and  nature reserves are located in Althütte's municipal area.

Politics
Althütte has two boroughs (Ortsteile), and 16 villages: Fautspach, Gallenhof, Glaitenhof, Hahnenhof, Hörschhof, Hörschhöfer Sägmühle, Kallenberg, Klösterle, Lutzenberg, Nonnenmühle, Rottmannsberger Sägmühle, Schlichenhöfle, Schlichenweiler, Schöllhütte, Voggenhof, and Waldenweiler.

Coat of arms
Althütte's municipal coat of arms displays two white glassblowing pipes crossed over a field of blue. The coat of arms refers to the name Althütte and to Althütte's history of glassworking.

Transportation
Althütte is connected to Germany's network of roadways by its local Landesstraßen and Kreisstraßen. Local public transportation is provided by the Verkehrs- und Tarifverbund Stuttgart.

References

External links

  (in German)

Rems-Murr-Kreis
Württemberg